Cymothoe sassiana is a butterfly in the family Nymphalidae. It is found in the Democratic Republic of the Congo.

Subspecies
Cymothoe sassiana sassiana (north-eastern Democratic Republic of the Congo)
Cymothoe sassiana intermedia Neustetter, 1912 (south-central Democratic Republic of the Congo)

References

Butterflies described in 1912
Cymothoe (butterfly)
Endemic fauna of the Democratic Republic of the Congo
Butterflies of Africa
Taxa named by Henri Schouteden